Parliamentary elections were held in Greece on Sunday, 16 September 2007 to elect the 300 members of the Hellenic Parliament. The leading party for a second term was New Democracy under the leadership of Kostas Karamanlis with 42%, followed by George Papandreou and PASOK with 38%. New Democracy managed to secure an absolute but narrow majority of 152 out of 300 seats in parliament. The populist Popular Orthodox Rally entered the parliament for the first time with 10 seats, while the parties of the left, the Communist Party of Greece (KKE) and Syriza, enjoyed a significant increase in their vote share. KKE received 8% of the votes (up from 6%) and won 22 seats (from 12), while Syriza received 5% of the votes (up 2pp) and 14 seats.

The difference of nearly four percentage points between the first two parties resulted in George Papandreou announcing that he would seek reaffirmation of his party leadership, with Evangelos Venizelos and Kostas Skandalidis also declaring candidacy for the post.

Background
August 22, 2007: The Democratic Social Movement (DIKKI) (6th largest party in the previous elections) announced its electoral alliance with the Coalition of the Radical Left (SYRIZA).
August 29, 2007: Opinion pollers MRB came under criticism from PASOK. Mathematical inconsistencies were alleged, such as response tallies summing up to more than 100%. MRB denied the allegations. MRB's parent company, Spot-Thompson Greece, are New Democracy's advertisers.
August 30, 2007: MRB came under more fire as it cancelled publication of its regular biannual "Trends" survey, citing extreme difficulty in obtaining accurate information in the fire-stricken areas.  Critics said that this admission automatically rendered previous voting behavior MRB estimates from these areas unreliable; yet, the election results in the prefectures which were devastated by the fires (Ilia, Euboea and Arcadia), were marked by a loss in votes for both the main opposition party and the ruling party.
September 1, 2007: The Areios Pagos refused to certify Fofi Gennimata as a candidate for the PASOK nationwide list, citing non-eligibility because Mrs. Gennimata is elected the superprefect of Athens and Piraeus.  This was criticised angrily by PASOK as an attempt to politicise the courts.
September 2, 2007: The Areios Pagos:
refused to include the title of DIKKI in the electoral alliance of SYRIZA claiming that the internal procedures followed by DIKKI were flawed.  This was criticised furiously by SYRIZA and DIKKI as inappropriate interference in party political activity on behalf of the courts.
refused to allow the New Fascism party contest the election because of its provocative name.
refused to allow the New Salvation Party – Christian Democracy to use the Cross as its logo on the grounds that it is a religious symbol.
excluded seven other parties from the elections for failure to pay the required electoral deposit.
September 6, 2007: NET state television, in simulcast with the major private TV stations, broadcast the debate among the leaders of ND, PASOK, Communist Party of Greece (KKE), SYRIZA, Popular Orthodox Rally (LAOS), and Democratic Revival, who were questioned by six reporters in six rounds of questions and follow-ups. Questions and responses were rotated and timed. The debate lasted approximately 2.5 hours and concluded with a two-minute speech by each leader. The debate format, agreed beforehand by the participating parties, met with criticism for being too rigid and formal, too protective of the politicians and not conducive to exhaustive scrutiny of their policies.

Electoral system
There were concerns that the election could return a hung parliament, mainly due to the recently revised Greek electoral law. Although it preserved the 3% threshold necessary for a party to enter parliament, it decreased the number of seats automatically awarded to the leading party. Parliamentary majority was considered more difficult, especially after the early projection that five parties would cross this threshold for the first time after the metapolitefsi.

According to the electoral law, the first-past-the post party was automatically awarded a bonus of 40 parliamentary seats. The remaining 260 seats were divided among all parties that achieved a minimum 3% nationwide vote tally, strictly in proportion to their polling returns. Since a majority of 151 seats was required, the leading party should secure at least 111 seats (42.7% of 260) in order to be able to form a government. Karamanlis had stated that in the event that no party should manage to achieve a majority, he would seek a new election.  Papandreou had vaguely indicated that he may have pursued an alliance with the left, however the SYRIZA and KKE parties had categorically dismissed any possibility of participating in a coalition with any of the major parties.

No opinion polls were allowed to be published after September 1. The polls publicized prior to the election had concluded that:
The next Parliament would be a five-party Parliament.
New Democracy would hold a smaller lead over PASOK at around 2%.
The goal of a workable parliamentary majority hung in the brink, with some pollsters projecting 147–149 and some 151–153 seats for the leading party.

The law traditionally requires that voting begins at "sunrise" and ends at "sunset". In practice this is rounded up to the nearest top of the hour. Voting began at 7 am and concluded at 7 pm. 7 pm was also the time when media outlets publicized their exit polls and issued their predictions. According to SingularLogic, the information technology contractor of the Ministry of the Interior, initial returns would not reach statistical significance before 11 pm and firm estimates might not emerge until after midnight. Voting took place in 20,623 polling stations – mostly schools – throughout the country, each of which catered to 400–500 voters on average.

Opinion polls
A collection of opinion polls taken before the elections is listed below. According to a law, which was voted by the Greek parliament, publication of opinion polls is forbidden in the fortnight prior to the election date. Therefore, the last day when opinion polls were published was September 1, 2007, and practically all opinion polling firms published their final public reports on August 31, 2007, in time for the evening news.

Exit polls
The Greek media outlets issued their exit polls at 19:00 local time.

Results

By region

Aftermath
At 01:00 on 17 September 2007 PASOK leader George Papandreou conceded defeat and Prime Minister Kostas Karamanlis thanked the electorate for granting him and his party a renewed term in office. Papandreou also stated that he will seek his party's direct reaffirmation in his leadership, and Evangelos Venizelos, PASOK's informal #2, declared himself "present" in this process. Papandreou went on and retained his leadership.

See also
List of members of the Hellenic Parliament, 2007–2009

Notes

References

Further reading
Dinas, Elias (2008) 'Greek general election of 2007: you cannot lose if your opponent cannot win,' West European Politics 31: 600–607.
Gemenis, Kostas (2008) 'The 2007 Parliamentary Election in Greece,' Mediterranean Politics 13: 95–101.
Gemenis, Kostas (2009) 'A Green comeback in Greece? The Ecologist Greens in the 2007 parliamentary election,' Environmental Politics 18: 128–134.
Karamichas, John (2007) 'The impact of the summer 2007 forest fires in Greece: recent environmental mobilizations, cyber-activism and electoral performance,' South European Society and Politics 12: 521–33.

External links

Ta Nea/Athens News election website  

Parliamentary elections in Greece
2007 in Greek politics
Legislative
Greece
Greece